The Kannur Corporation, also known as Corporation of Cannanore, is the municipal corporation that administers the city of Kannur (Cannanore), Kerala. Established in 2015, the Corporation's first mayor was E. P. Latha. Kannur Corporation has two assembly constituencies – Kannur (State Assembly constituency) and Azhikode (State Assembly constituency) – both of which are part of the Kannur parliamentary constituency. The Corporation is headed by a Mayor and council, and manages 78.35 km2 of Kannur city, with a population of about 232,486 within that area. Kannur Municipal Corporation has been formed with functions to improve the infrastructure of town.

History 

The ancient port of Naura, which is mentioned in the Periplus of the Erythraean Sea as a port somewhere north of Muziris is identified with Kannur. Ezhimala was the headquarters of a powerful kingdom who later became Mushika dynasty in the ancient period. Kannur was an important trading centre in the 12th century, with active business connections with Persia and Arabia. In his book on travels (Il Milione), Marco Polo recounts his visit to the area in the mid 1290s. Other visitors included Faxian, the Buddhist pilgrim and Ibn Batuta, writer and historian of Tangiers. It served as the British military headquarters on India's west coast until 1887. Kannur Cantonment is the only cantonment board in Kerala. Kannur was the capital city of Kolathunadu, one of the four powerful kingdoms who ruled Kerala during the medieval period. Arakkal Kingdom and Chirakkal kingdom were two vassal kingdoms based in the city of Kannur. The port at Kozhikode held the superior economic and political position in medieval Kerala coast, while Kannur, Kollam, and Kochi, were commercially important secondary ports, where the traders from various parts of the world would gather.

The Portuguese arrived at Kappad Kozhikode in 1498 during the Age of Discovery, thus opening a direct sea route from Europe to India. The St. Angelo Fort at Kannur was built in 1505 by Dom Francisco de Almeida, the first Portuguese Viceroy of India.  The Dutch captured the fort from the Portuguese in 1663. They modernized the fort and built the bastions Hollandia, Zeelandia, and Frieslandia that are the major features of the present structure. The original Portuguese fort was pulled down later. A painting of this fort and the fishing ferry behind it can be seen in the Rijksmuseum Amsterdam. The Dutch sold the fort to the king Ali Raja of Arakkal in 1772.

During the 17th century, Kannur was the capital city of the only Muslim Sultanate in the Malabar region -  Arakkal. Arakkal Kingdom and Chirakkal kingdom were two vassal kingdoms based in the city of Kannur. The Ali Rajas of Arakkal kingdom, near Kannur, who were the vassals of the Kolathiri, ruled over the Lakshadweep islands. The island of Dharmadom near Kannur, along with Thalassery, was ceded to the East India Company as early as 1734, which were claimed by all of the Kolattu Rajas, Kottayam Rajas, and  Arakkal Bibi in the late medieval period, where the British initiated a factory and English settlement following the cession. The British conquered the fort Kannur in 1790 and used it as one of their major military stations on the Malabar Coast. During the British Raj, Kannur was part of the Madras presidency in the Malabar District.

Kannur municipality was formed on 1 November 1866 according to the Madras Act 10 of 1865 (Amendment of the Improvements in Towns act 1850) of the British Indian Empire, making it the second oldest municipality in the state. The Kannur Municipal Corporation was created by merging the erstwhile Municipality of Kannur, and Panchayats of Pallikunnu, Puzhathi, Edakkad, Elayavoor, and Chelora in 2015.

Revenue sources 

The following are the Income sources for the Corporation from the Central and State Government.

Revenue from taxes  
Following is the Tax related revenue for the corporation.

 Property tax.
 Profession tax.
 Entertainment tax.
 Grants from Central and State Government like Goods and Services Tax.
 Advertisement tax.

Revenue from non-tax sources 

Following is the Non Tax related revenue for the corporation.

 Water usage charges.
 Fees from Documentation services.
 Rent received from municipal property.
 Funds from municipal bonds.

Members of the Corporation Council

Key

Election results

Kannur Municipal Corporation Election 2020

Kannur Municipal Corporation Election 2015

Mayors of Kannur

Deputy Mayors

References

External links
 Official website

Municipal corporations in Kerala
2015 establishments in Kerala
Kannur